The purpose of this list is to identify all historically significant English cricket clubs and teams which played in significant matches, some of which may have been given first-class status. It concentrates on those which are now defunct or not currently significant. The list, therefore, excludes County Championship clubs, Marylebone Cricket Club (MCC), touring teams and the main university clubs. Clubs in the Minor Counties Cricket Championship or in one of the ECB Premier Leagues are excluded unless they formerly played in important or first-class matches.

Note that some clubs which folded were subsequently refounded as modern league clubs. Many of the teams were ad hoc units or "scratch teams" named after their organiser (e.g., Alfred Shaw's XI) while others are combinations (e.g., London & Surrey). The total column gives the number of matches that the team is known to have played in. In the source column, if only one citation is given, it relates to the earliest known mention of the team in the surviving records.

N.B. The list is believed complete for clubs and teams that were active in significant cricket up to 1825. Many clubs and teams post-1825 are already included but they are not exhaustive.

A

B

C

D

E

F

G

H

I

J

K

L

M

N

O

P

R

S

T

U

W

Y

References

Bibliography
 
 
 
 
 
 
 
 
 
 
 
 
 
 

Cricket